Law enforcement in Eswatini is the primarily the responsibility of the Royal Eswatini Police Service  (REPS), which oversees internal security as well as border and customs control, and His Majesty's Correctional Services (HMCS), which is tasked with maintaining and guarding prisons. It is estimated that about 35% of Government of Eswatini employees work in the security services. The country has been part of INTERPOL since October 1975 and the organization has an office in the capital of Eswatini, Mbabane.

History
Founded in 1907 when the territory was under British rule, the Royal Swaziland Police Force initially consisted of 22 European officers along with 125 African Zulus, under Captain C.H. Gibson. A police training school was established in Mbabane in 1927 and a modern training college was built in 1965 at Matsapha. During the independence celebrations in 1968 King Sobhuza II renamed it into the Royal Swaziland Police Service, with the legal document that established the organization being the Police Act No. 29/1957.

Organization
Both the RSPS and HMCS are directly commanded by the King of Eswatini, who serves as the commander-in-chief of both the military of Eswatini and law enforcement agencies. The RSPS is formally part of the office of the Prime Minister of Eswatini, but the head of the service, the Police Commissioner, answers directly to the King who is the police commander-in-chief.  

The executive command of the RSPS, under the Police Commissioner and two vice commissioners, is based in Mbabane, while there are four regional police departments. Subordinated to the four regional headquarters are 23 police stations, 22 police posts, and 12 border posts, as well as one airport security monitoring post. There is also a support unit and a police college subordinated to the executive command. The HCMS consists of fourteen offices, including the training college and the head office.

Police regional organization:

Function and accountability
According to a report from the U.S. Department of State in early 2017, law enforcement personnel are generally professional but are susceptible to corruption and political pressure. The police force has a problem with corruption and although an internal investigation was conducted into this, the results were not made public.

The objectives of the RSPS are as follows:  
 Maintain peace and public order
 Prevent and detect crime
 Control traffic and reduce accidents
 Pursue and apprehend offenders and bring them to justice
 Execute court summons and subpoenas
 Enforce state law
 Collate information on internal state security
 Provide security to royalty and VIPs
 To respect the rule of law and execute Royal orders

References

External links